AD 12 (XII) was a leap year starting on Friday (link will display the full calendar) of the Julian calendar. At the time it was known as the Year of the Consulship of Caesar and Capito (or, less frequently, year 765 Ab urbe condita). The denomination AD 12 for this year has been used since the early medieval period, when the Anno Domini calendar era became the prevalent method in Europe for naming years.

Events

By place

Roman Empire 
 Annius Rufus is appointed Prefect of Judea.
 Augustus orders a major invasion of Germany beyond the Rhine.
 Quirinius returns from Judea to become a counselor to Tiberius.
 The Armenian Artaxiad Dynasty is overthrown by the Romans.

By topic

Arts and sciences 
 Ovid stops writing Fasti because of the lack of resources (being far from the libraries of Rome).  He completes 6 books that detail festivals found in the Roman Calendar.

Births 
 Mark the Evangelist, Christian evangelist, martyr, known for The Gospel of Mark (approximate date) (d. 68 AD)
 August 31 – Caligula, Roman Emperor (d. 41 AD)

Deaths 
Rhoemetalces I - king of the Odrysian kingdom of Thrace from 12 BC to 12 AD

References 

 

als:10er#12